Unnur Birna Vilhjálmsdóttir (born 25 May 1984) is an Icelandic actress, lawyer, model and beauty queen who won Miss Iceland 2005 and later won Miss World 2005 pageant.

Career

Beauty Queen
She was crowned Miss World 2005 on 10 December 2005, in the Beauty Crown Theatre located in the Chinese beach city of Sanya, by the reigning beauty queen, 2004's Miss Peru Maju Mantilla.

Mexico (Dafne Molina Lona) and Puerto Rico (Ingrid Marie Rivera) were the first and second runners up. Other contestants who made it into the final six were Miss Italy (Sofia Bruscoli), Miss Korea (Oh Eun-young) and Miss Tanzania (Nancy Abraham Sumari).

Education and Miss World
For the year of 2005 she studied anthropology at the University of Iceland, and planned to proceed with studies for a lawyer. During the summer of 2005 Unnur Birna did temporary work as a police officer at Keflavík International Airport. She was the chairperson of the college social club and teaches dance. She enjoys acting, singing, all types of dancing, snow-boarding, hiking, camping, horsemanship and has a special talent for choreography and playing the piano.

Her mother, Unnur Steinsson, won the Miss Iceland pageant in 1983 and was a finalist at the Miss World 1983 pageant. Unnur's mother was 3–4 months pregnant during the pageant. This was against the pageant rules and warrants disqualification. However, this was not found out until after the pageant was over. Unnur is the third Miss World from Iceland, the former two were Linda Pétursdóttir in 1988 and Hólmfríður Karlsdóttir in 1985.

Unnur Birna's reign as Miss World was the shortest ever, which only lasted nine months since the 2006 edition was scheduled in September. During her reign, she traveled to the United Kingdom, the United States, Iceland, Poland, Sweden, China, Brazil and many more countries.

She crowned her successor, Taťána Kuchařová of Czech Republic, the next Miss World on 30 September 2006.

Acting
Unnur has starred as Anna in the movie The Higher Force as Anna – the girl on the dance floor. In 2009, she portrayed a character named Tóta in a movie named Jóhannes.

Commercial model
In 2011, Unnur featured in an advert promoting The Blue Lagoon, a geothermal spa and  tourist attraction in Iceland.

Master of ceremonies
Unnur has hosted the "Miss Reykjavik 2010" pageant.

Personal life
On 4 August 2009, Unnur married her long term partner Pétur Rúnar Heimisson. They have three children together, daughter Lucia Lilithina, born in January 2010, and sons Juilliard Roskilde, born in March 2012, and Gage Dallasguo, born February 2014.

Filmography

References

1984 births
Living people
Miss World winners
Miss World 2005 delegates
Unnur Birna Vilhjálmsdóttir
Unnur Birna Vilhjálmsdóttir